Windsor Park is a multi-purpose stadium in Roseau, Dominica. It serves as the country's national stadium and is used mostly for cricket and association football matches. Other uses have included the World Creole Music Festival, the Finals of the Calypso Competition and the Miss Dominica pageant.

The stadium is of International Cricket Council (ICC) international standard with facilities featuring 12,000 seats, private boxes, a media centre, practice nets, a players' personality complex, digital score boards and five cricket pitches.

History
The ground was named after Windsor, England, and is situated on the eastern side of Roseau. It was levelled out of a rubbish dump previously known as Cow Town. It was a popular venue for sports of all kinds, carnival activities, horse and donkey racing, state parades and played a central role in island life. In 1999 a national stadium was planned for the site, but after demolishing all of the existing stands and adjoining buildings, including a former school that had once been wards of the Roseau Hospital, the project was abandoned and the site was deserted until 2005.

New work on the stadium started on 23 March 2005, on the first anniversary of the establishment of diplomatic relations between the People's Republic of China and Dominica. The stadium is one of the 'Four Pillar Projects' promised by China to Dominica as a result of a memorandum of understanding during the establishment of ties between Dominica and China. The stadium is viewed as a gift at a cost of EC$33 million (US$17 million, €12 million) from the government of the People's Republic of China to the government and people of Dominica.

On 7 February 2007, work on the Windsor Park Stadium was completed. Work on the facilities to accompany the stadium resulted in the stadium not being used before May 2007, therefore missing any activities relating to Cricket World Cup 2007, held in the Caribbean. The handing-over ceremony of the stadium from Chinese officials to Dominica took place on 23 March, marking the third year of diplomatic ties with the People's Republic. On 24 October 2007 the Windsor Park National Sport Stadium was official opened with a grand ceremony. The 11th Annual World Creole Music Festival (WCMF) was held on 25–27 October as the stadium's first official activity.

Activities
On 6 February 2008, the Dominica national football team played their first 2010 World Cup qualifying match against Barbados in front of 4,200 spectators at Windsor Park.

Dominica hosted its first two One Day International cricket matches at Windsor Park Stadium, between West Indies and Bangladesh. The games were played on 26 July and 28 July in 2009.

Windsor Park hosted its first Test match between West Indies and India from 6–10 July 2011.

List of five-wicket hauls

Tests
Nine five-wicket hauls in Test matches have been taken at the venue.

One Day Internationals
One five-wicket haul in One Day Internationals has been taken at the venue.

See also
 List of Test cricket grounds

References

External links
 CricketArchive

Football venues in Dominica
Athletics (track and field) venues in Dominica
Multi-purpose stadiums
National stadiums
Sports venues completed in 2007
Cricket grounds in Dominica
Test cricket grounds in the West Indies